NOWZONE Fashion Mall is a shopping centre in District 1 of Ho Chi Minh City, Vietnam. It is located at 235 Nguyen Van Cu Street, in Nguyen Cu Trinh Ward.

External links
 

Shopping malls in Ho Chi Minh City